John Maurer (born July 14, 1961) is an American musician who was a longtime bass guitarist for Social Distortion from 1984 to 2004.

Career
He joined Social Distortion in early 1984 after the departure of Brent Liles in late 1983. He played on every album from Prison Bound to Sex, Love and Rock 'n' Roll. He has a songwriting credit on the song "So Far Away" from Social Distortion's 1990 eponymous album along with frontman Mike Ness.

In his later career he started two bands, Foxy and Fuel, while still playing for Social Distortion.  He also started his own record company called Slip Records. He stated in an interview with HM Magazine that, while in Social Distortion, he became a devout Christian.

He was replaced by Rancid's Matt Freeman in August 2004.

Personal life
Maurer is married to his wife Wendy, with whom he has two children. Maurer has two sisters, Julie and Marcie, both whom also reside in California. His mother, Stubbie is an interior designer.

Discography with Social Distortion
Prison Bound (1988)
Social Distortion (1990)
Somewhere Between Heaven And Hell (1992)
White Light, White Heat, White Trash (1996)
Live at the Roxy (1998)
Sex, Love and Rock 'n' Roll  (2004)

References 

1961 births
Living people
American punk rock bass guitarists
American male bass guitarists
Social Distortion members
Converts to Christianity from atheism or agnosticism
American male guitarists
20th-century American guitarists